Kalicharan is a 1988 Indian Tamil-language action film directed by L. Raja, starring Karthik, Sripriya, Gouthami, Madhuri and Charan Raj. It was released on 2 December 1988.

Plot

Cast 
Karthik as Raja
Gouthami as Gouthami
Madhuri as Julie
Charan Raj as Inspector Charan
Jai Ganesh as Periya Dorai
Anandaraj as Anandraj
Sripriya
Delhi Ganesh as  DIG
S. S. Chandran

Soundtrack 
Soundtrack was composed by Chandrabose.
"Suriyare" – Malaysia Vasudevan
"Vaanam Bhoomi" – Prabhakar, Sunanda, TL Thyagarajan
"Oorukku Therinjachu" – Malaysia Vasudevan
"Thodalam" – Prabhakar, Vani Jairam
"Gramathula" – Mano, S. P. Sailaja

References

External links 

1980s Tamil-language films
1988 action films
1988 films
Films directed by L. Raja
Films scored by Chandrabose (composer)
Indian action films